The Roland SP-606 is a music sampler manufactured by Roland Corporation. It is part of the SP family, which includes Roland’s popular SP-303 and SP-404 installments. Released in the year of 2004, the sampler was soon succeeded in 2005 by the SP-404.

Features

Unlike the predecessors, the SP-606 was designed in collaboration with Cakewalk. As a result, the sampler was bundled with the then-new P606 software from Cakewalk for enhanced integration and functionality with a PC. The SP-606 has over 40 various effects, which include Isolator, Filter + Drive, Slicer, Reverb, Tape Echo. It also has the D Beam feature, which allows the user to control 3 different effects physically, including synth, trigger, and filter. The maximum number of samples that can be internally stored is 128. Samples are recorded in 'SP606 original format', with the memory used equating roughly to 16MB. Audio samples are imported and exported in WAV/AIF file format, by way of CompactFlash. Additionally, CompactFlash is used to update the sampler itself. MIDI can be transferred via USB connection for both Mac and PC.

Users
Despite not being initially popular and successful as the SP-303 and SP-404 installments upon release, the digital sampler managed to receive a small following over the years, being utilized by notable producers such as Madlib.

References

Further reading
SP-Forums.com - An active forum dedicated to Roland's SP range

External links
 https://www.roland.com/global/products/sp-606/

SP-606
Roland
Workstations
Samplers (musical instrument)
Grooveboxes
D-Beam
Music sequencers
Sound modules
Music workstations
Hip hop production
Japanese inventions